Edward Tate (born 1901 in South Shields, England) was an English football fullback who began his career in Canada and finished it in the American Soccer League.

Tate, a native of England, played with the England national team at the schoolboy level. At some point, he moved to Canada where he began his professional career in 1921 with New Waterford in Nova Scotia, Canada. He then moved to Canadian Explosives in 1922. That year, he left Canada and signed with the Fall River Marksmen of the American Soccer League. He spent four seasons in Fall River, winning the 1924 National Challenge Cup with them. He then began the 1926–1927 season in Fall River before moving to J&P Coats ten games into the season. However, he was back in Fall River for the 1927–1928 season when J&P Coats traded him on 19 August 1927 for Findlay Kerr. For the next three seasons, Tate bounced through several teams. While he began the 1927–1928 season in Fall River, he jumped to New Bedford Whalers at the end of the season. He then returned to J&P Coats for the start of the 1928–1929 season only to finish it with Philadelphia Field Club  He then played the fall 1929 and began the 1929–1930 season with the Marksmen, but finished it with the Pawtucket Rangers. He finally found a home in Pawtucket and remained with the Rangers until his retirement when he became the team's coach for two seasons.

External links
 National Soccer League eligibility profile

References

1901 births
1967 deaths
English footballers
English expatriate footballers
American Soccer League (1921–1933) coaches
American Soccer League (1921–1933) players
Fall River Marksmen players
J&P Coats players
New Bedford Whalers players
Pawtucket Rangers players
Philadelphia Field Club players
Association football defenders
English expatriate sportspeople in the United States
Expatriate soccer players in the United States
English football managers